Cairo agreement may refer to the following:
 Cairo Agreement (1959) – also known as Maadi Pact or Gentlemen's Agreement, leading to formation of OPEC
 Cairo Agreement (1969) – agreement between Palestinian leader Yassir Arafat and Lebanese General Emile Bustani
 Cairo Agreement (1994) – Agreement on the Gaza Strip and the Jericho Area
 Cairo Agreement (2012) – reconciliation accord between Hamas and Fatah